Ahmed Goumar (born 22 February 1988) is a Nigerien judoka.

He competed at the 2016 Summer Olympics in Rio de Janeiro, in the men's 73 kg, where he was eliminated by Nicholas Delpopolo in the first round.

References

External links
 

1988 births
Living people
Nigerien male judoka
Olympic judoka of Niger
Judoka at the 2016 Summer Olympics